The Flores leaf warbler (Phylloscopus floresianus) is a species of Old World warbler in the family Phylloscopidae. It is found on Flores island. It was formerly considered to be conspecific with the Timor leaf warbler (Phylloscopus presbytes).

References

 Gill F, D Donsker & P Rasmussen  (Eds). 2022. IOC World Bird List (v12.1). doi :  10.14344/IOC.ML.12.1

Flores leaf warbler
Flores leaf warbler